Kermia aegyptiaca is a species of sea snail, a marine gastropod mollusk in the family Raphitomidae.

Description
The length of the shell attains 6 mm.

Distribution
This species occurs in the Red Sea off Hurghada, Egypt

References

External links
 Biolib.cz : image
 Gastropods.com: Kermia aegyptiaca

aegyptiaca
Gastropods described in 2008